Toni Ioneticu (2 December 1989, Adunații-Copăceni) is a Romanian sprint canoeist. At the 2012 Summer Olympics, he competed in the Men's K-4 1000 metres, with Traian Neagu, Ștefan Vasile and Petrus Gavrila, finishing in 8th place with the team in the final.

References

Romanian male canoeists
Living people
Olympic canoeists of Romania
Canoeists at the 2012 Summer Olympics

1989 births
People from Giurgiu